Franklin Johndro (1835 – April 5, 1901) was a Union Army soldier in the American Civil War who received the U.S. military's highest decoration, the Medal of Honor.

Johndro was born in Highgate Falls, Vermont, and entered service at Queensbury, in New York. He served as a Private with Company A, 118th New York Infantry.

"Rounded up Forty Rebels"
Johndro was awarded the Medal of Honor, for extraordinary heroism shown in Henrico County, Virginia, for bravery in action during the Battle of Chaffin's Farm, on September 30, 1864.

At the order of Company A's captain, Johndro charged single-handedly against a group of Confederate soldiers who were stationed at the top of a slight hill. The Confederate soldiers were cut off from the larger Confederate army, and so were unable to retreat; yet, their position allowed them to hold back Union advances. With nothing more than a bayoneted rifle in hand, Johndro advanced against heavy fire and captured forty Confederates as prisoner.

His Medal of Honor was issued on April 6, 1865. At the ceremony, his colonel was recorded as saying: "Johndro, if I owned this Medal of Honor and had won it in the way you did, I should think more of it than I do of the eagles that I carry on my shoulders."

Medal of Honor citation

Death and burial
Johndro died on April 5, 1901 and was buried at Glens Falls Cemetery in Glens Falls, New York.

References

External links
 Brief Johndro anecdote and photo in Deeds of Valor, 1901
 

1835 births
1901 deaths
Date of birth unknown
American Civil War recipients of the Medal of Honor
Burials in Warren County, New York
People from Highgate, Vermont
Union Army soldiers
United States Army Medal of Honor recipients